The Out of Control Tour was the fifth concert tour by British-Irish girl group Girls Aloud. It supported their fifth studio album Out of Control. Initially, just ten dates in bigger arenas were announced in November 2008. Due to demand, more dates were added. Girls Aloud performed thirty-two dates across the United Kingdom and Ireland. The tour commenced on 24 April 2009 at the Manchester Evening News Arena, with the final show on 6 June 2009 in Newcastle's Metro Radio Arena.

The show was divided into five unique sections with distinct costumes, including the encore. Each member of the group had their own respective platform. During the show, Girls Aloud used pole dancing techniques and themes of BDSM. Most of the songs performed come from Out of Control, but earlier singles and cover versions were also performed. Like 2008's Tangled Up Tour, there is a smaller stage in the centre of the arena that Girls Aloud perform on during the show.

Background and development 

Girls Aloud announced their plans to tour in support of Out of Control in mid-November 2008. Initially, just ten tour dates in bigger arenas across the United Kingdom and Ireland were announced, with tickets going on sale on 14 November. Due to arenas selling out, Girls Aloud added a number of live shows to the tour. Cheryl Cole's hometown of Newcastle sold particularly well, with the group scheduled to play a record-breaking four nights. Girls Aloud were also scheduled to play three dates in Belfast, Birmingham, Glasgow, Liverpool, and four dates in London and Manchester. The group performed three nights in O2 Arena and two at Wembley Arena.

The group began rehearsals "straight after Christmas". They took pole dancing lessons to prepare for a routine. Cheryl Cole and Kimberley Walsh missed some tour rehearsals, citing exhaustion following their charity climb of Mount Kilimanjaro for Comic Relief.

Girls Aloud's rider includes treadmills, various exercise machines, and scented candles, as well as a physical therapist and masseuse. Each individual member has her own respective hairdresser and make-up artist.

Emma Deigman was confirmed as the supporting act during the tour. Other support acts included Julian Perretta, Girls Can't Catch and Absent Elk. In addition to their own dates, Girls Aloud and American rapper Jay Z were support acts for Coldplay's Viva la Vida Tour at Wembley Stadium on 18 September 2009.

Concert synopsis 

Girls Aloud start the show with their number one Brit Award-winning single "The Promise", "burst[ing] up out of the floor wearing long, spangly dresses which they whipped off to reveal short mini skirts." They rise above the stage on individual hydraulic podiums. Girls Aloud then perform Out of Control album track "Love Is the Key", followed by "Biology" and another album track entitled "Miss You Bow Wow." The dancers perform to an extended instrumental of "Miss You Bow Wow" while Girls Aloud change.

During the show's second section, Girls Aloud wear black-and-white kimono-inspired playsuits. They perform "The Loving Kind", followed by a revival of "Waiting", an album track from 2005's Chemistry. They then sing hit single "Love Machine" and "Rolling Back the Rivers in Time." During a performance of "Untouchable", Girls Aloud "fly" on a platform to a smaller, specially-constructed stage in the centre of the arena. They perform "Sexy! No No No..." with a dance break containing interpolations of Rihanna's "Disturbia". They perform a cover of James Morrison's "Broken Strings". The album track "Love Is Pain" is performed, followed by "Call the Shots", as Girls Aloud return to the main stage.

Following a video sequence, "Revolution in the Head" is performed. Girls Aloud then perform debut single "Sound of the Underground". Girls Aloud pole dance for a performance of the album track "Fix Me Up" in "skintight dominatrix gear." A cover of Britney Spears' "Womanizer" features BDSM themes in its performance. The girls wear "tiny PVC outfits" and use whips on their dancers. This section ends with "Something Kinda Ooooh". Girls Aloud return in butterfly sequined corsets for their final number. The encore of the show is a megamix of Girls Aloud's other hits, consisting of: "The Show", "Wake Me Up", "Jump", "No Good Advice", "Can't Speak French", and a reprise of "The Promise."

Opening acts 
Absent Elk 
Emma Deigman 
Will & The People 
Girls Can't Catch 
Julian Perretta

Setlist 

The following setlist is obtained from the concert held on 26 April 2009, at The O Arena in London, England. It does not represent all concerts for the duration of the tour.
Section 1
"The Promise"
"Love is the Key"
"Biology"
"Miss You Bow Wow"
Section 2
"The Loving Kind"
"Waiting"
"Love Machine"
"Rolling Back the Rivers in Time"
Section 3
"Untouchable"
"Sexy! No No No..." (contains elements of "Disturbia")
"Broken Strings"
"Love is Pain"
"Call the Shots"
Section 4
"Revolution in the Head"
"Sound of the Underground"
"Fix Me Up"
"Womanizer"
"Something Kinda Ooooh"
Encore
Hits Medley: "The Show"/"Wake Me Up"/"Jump"/"No Good Advice"/"Can't Speak French"
"The Promise" (reprise)

Tour dates

Box office score data

Broadcast and recordings 

The show was filmed on 24 May 2009 at The O2 Arena in London. A DVD called "Out of Control: Live From The O2 2009" was released on 5 October 2009, with a Blu-ray following on 12 October respectively. As well as the full live show, the DVD included several bonus features, including a Girl-cam that allowed the viewer to follow their favourite band member as she performed a song on tour. Also included are the videos for the singles "The Promise", "The Loving Kind" and "Untouchable", as well as the tour screen visuals and interviews. A limited edition was also available from Girls Aloud's official website, including a live CD to accompany the DVD/Blu-ray.

In a review of the DVD, Phil Udell of State said, "Girls Aloud are great pop stars. […] their fourth live DVD finds them bestriding the live pop experience in high heels. […] It's hugely entertaining." CBBC Newsround gave the release three stars out of five, stating, "It's definitely a hit for fans, but it's unlikely to convert anyone who isn't already into their music."

The live video album reached number two on the music DVD chart in its first week, falling to the number three in its second week. The DVD remained at number three in its third week. It returned to number two the following week. The DVD was certified gold by the British Phonographic Industry.

DVD track listing 
Entire concert
Special features
Music videos for "The Promise", "The Loving Kind" and "Untouchable"
Girl cam: "Revolution in the Head" (Cheryl), "Love Machine" (Nicola), "Miss You Bow Wow" (Sarah), "Sound of the Underground" (Nadine), "Love Is the Key" (Kimberley)
Behind-the-scenes tour interview
Tour screen visuals: "Womanizer", "Love Machine", "Love Is the Key", "Revolution in the Head" and "Biology"

Critical reception 
The Out of Control Tour received mostly positive reviews from contemporary music critics. Phil Udell of State wrote, "As a spectacle, it's second to none – opening with the five raised high into the air on moving plinths and taking in floating stages, dancers, pyrotechnics, costume changes, brass sections […] some of the best pop songs this side of the sixties." A reviewer from the Daily Mirror stated that "the slick routines proved why they're the UK's No1 girl band." David Balls of Digital Spy called it Girls Aloud's "most spectacular live show yet." Lauren Mulvenny of the Belfast Telegraph wrote, "the fiery five-piece proved themselves again as the queens of the pop anthem." Gillian Orr of The Independent gave the show three stars out of five, but felt that Girls Aloud should have performed more of their older hit singles as opposed to newer album tracks. Dave Simpson of The Guardian also awarded three stars out of five. Writing for City Life, Simon Donohue comments that "they sing, dance, smile and wave as though they each have an extra set of lungs and a monopoly on confidence."

The show was dubbed Girls Aloud's "raunchiest performance ever" due to provocative performances that employ pole dancing techniques and BDSM. Mulvenny wrote, "The show got even sexier when the costumes took a dominatrix twist […] alongside raunchy routines with shirtless male backing dancers."

References 

2009 concert tours
2009 in British music
2009 video albums
Concert tours of the United Kingdom
Concert tours of Ireland
Girls Aloud concert tours
Girls Aloud video albums
Live video albums
April 2009 events in the United Kingdom
May 2009 events in the United Kingdom
June 2009 events in the United Kingdom
April 2009 events in Europe
May 2009 events in Europe
June 2009 events in Europe